The fifth season of the American dramatic television series Touched by an Angel aired CBS from September 20, 1998 through May 23, 1999, spanning 27 episodes. Created by John Masius and produced by Martha Williamson, the series chronicled the cases of two angels, Monica (Roma Downey) and her supervisor Tess (Della Reese), who bring messages from God to various people to help them as they reach a crossroads in their lives. They are frequently joined by Andrew (John Dye), the angel of death. A season set containing all of the episodes of the season was released to Region 1 DVD on July 24, 2012.

The episodes use the song "Walk with You", performed by Reese, as their opening theme.


Episodes

References

External links
 
 
 

Touched by an Angel seasons
Figure skating on television
1998 American television seasons
1999 American television seasons